The 42nd annual Venice International Film Festival was held on 26 August to 6 September 1985.

Jury
The following people comprised the 1985 jury:
 Krzysztof Zanussi (head of jury) (Poland)
 Guido Aristarco (Italy)   
 Gaspare Barbiellini Amidei (Italy) 
 Ricardo Bofill (Spain)   
 Frank Capra (USA)  
 Jean d'Ormesson (France) 
 Odysseas Elytis (Greece)  
 Kon Ichikawa (Japan) 
 Eugène Ionesco (France)  
 Elem Klimov (USSR) 
 Lino Micciché (Italy)  
 Zoran Mušič (Yugoslavia) 
 John Schlesinger (UK) 
 Renzo Vespignani (Italy)

Official selection

In competition

Autonomous sections

Venice International Film Critics' Week
The following feature films were selected to be screened as In Competition for this section:
 A Strange Love Affair by Eric de Kuyper, Paul Verstraten (Netherlands)
 El Haimoune (En. Wanderers of the Desert) by Nacer Khemir (Tunisia, France)
 Fandango by Kevin Reynolds (United States)
 The Record (Der Rekord) by Daniel Helfer (West Germany, Switzerland)
 The Disciples (A tanítványok) by Géza Bereményi (Hungary)
 Yesterday by Radosław Piwowarski (Poland)

Awards
Golden Lion:
Vagabond (Sans toit ni loi)  by Agnès Varda
Grand Special Jury Prize:
Tangos, the Exile of Gardel (Tangos, l'exil de Gardel) by Fernando Solanas
Special Jury Prize:
The Lightship by Jerzy Skolimowski
Silver Lion:
Dust by Marion Hänsel
Best Actor:
Gérard Depardieu (Police) 
Best Actress:
 NOT ASSIGNED.  The jury deemed the best performances to be Sandrine Bonnaire (Sans toit ni loi) and Jane Birkin (Dust), but decided against awarding the prize as both films won major awards. 
Special mentions:
Sonja Savić (Zivot je lep)
Galya Novents (Mer mankutyan tangon)
Themis Bazaka (Petrina hronia)
Career Golden Lion
Federico Fellini
Special Lion for the Overall Work
John Huston
Manoel de Oliveira
Sergio Trasatti Awards
Manoel de Oliveira (The Satin Slipper)
Special Mention — Juraj Jakubisko (The Feather Fairy)

References 

Edoardo Pittalis - Roberto Pugliese, Bella di Notte, August 1996
L'Europeo, Cinema in Laguna, SePtember 2008

External links 

Venice Film Festival 1985 Awards on IMDb

Venice
Venice
Venice
Venice Film Festival
Film
August 1985 events in Europe
September 1985 events in Europe